Robert Vernor Hammack, Jr. (January 22, 1922 Brookston, Texas – March 28, 1990 Riverside, California) was an American musician, originally from Texas, whose principal instrument was jazz piano. He led a prolific career in Los Angeles as a pianist, organist, conductor, arranger, and composer in (i) live venues, (ii) broadcast studios for radio and television, and (iii) recording studios for records, radio, television, and film. Hammack flourished in a wide spectrum of genres that included dixieland, Blues, swing, sweet dance music (e.g., Lawrence Welk), easy listening, gospel, liturgical jazz, musical theatre, Tin Pan Alley, classical, and film score.

Career 
In 1949, Hammack began appearing KLAC-TV as studio band pianist and, in 1950, guest host — Don Otis Show — and eventually host — Bobby Hammack and Joy Lane. Hammack was the West Coast musical director of the ABC-TV and radio networks between 1958 and 1963, during which he conducted his own orchestra and scored music for several TV shows, including Ed Sullivan, Glen Campbell, Red Skelton, and Johnny Mann's Stand-Up and Cheer. Hammack then was a conductor and a pianist for NBC. He joined ASCAP in 1958. Hammack's popular song compositions include I'm Going Home, Eliza, and You Bug Me.

Hammack got his first break playing piano for Red Nichols as one of his post-war Five Pennies, appearing with Nichols in a number of film shorts in the early 1950s. Hammack also worked as a freelance arranger and writer for Bob Crosby, Lawrence Welk, and Tony Osborne. His version of Raymond Scott's Powerhouse is featured on several space age pop compilations, and he also recorded with Esquivel.

Formal education 
Hammack earned a Bachelor of Fine Arts degree, majoring in music, from the University of Texas at Austin in 1945. He had entered as a freshman in the fall 1938, but, beginning September 21, 1942, spent two years in the Air Force, stationed at Muskogee, Oklahoma. At Texas, he studied piano at the newly established (1938) College of Fine Arts with Thomas Arthur Gorton, PhD (1910–1997), who, in addition to being a concert pianist, went on to become Dean of the School of Fine Arts at the University of Kansas from 1950 to 1975.

 He graduated from Paris High School in 1938. Hammack was also a proficient trombonist. While in high school and college, Hammack led his own dance orchestra.

Selected discography 
As leader
 Powerhouse, The Bobby Hammack Quartet, Liberty Records (1955) 
 The Bobby Hammack Quintet, ABC Paramount (1956)
 Solid! South Pacific, Bobby Hammack Quintet Liberty Records (1957) 
 Lovely Hula Hands, Bobby Hammack (organ), Coral Records (195?) 
 Rhythm, Bobby Hammack Orchestra, Capitol Records (1959)
 Ultra-Lounge, Vol. 3: Space Capades, Bobby Hammack Combo, Capitol Records (1996) 
 My Favorite Things (side A); The Farewell Song (side B), Swirl Daze (45 rpm) (1960)

 As leader of the back-up musical group
 Pink Shoe Laces, Dodie Stevens, Bobby Hammack Combo, Dot Records (45 rpm) (1959) 

As keyboardist (re-release dates)
 2004: Original Jazz Compositions, West Coast All-Stars
 2003: The Drugstore's Rockin', Vol. 3, Pat Boone
 2003: Tutti's Trumpets and Trombones, Tutti Camarata 
 2002: Morning Glory, Red Nichols
 2002: The Greatest Original Artists 
 2002: The Snader Transcriptions: Dixieland Jazz, Vol. 2, Firehouse Five Plus Two
 1999: Battle Hymn of the Republic, Red Nichols
 1999: See It In Sound, Esquivel
 1998: Happy Jazz, Red Nichols
 1997: Move Over Darling, Doris Day
 1983: Tutti's Trombones, Tutti Camarata
 1963: The Happy Beat, Ray Conniff  
 1961: Mr. Lucky Goes Latin, Henry Mancini 
 1959: Dixieland Blues, Johnny Maddox & The Rhythmasters
 Jazz in the Charts, Vol. 90: Everything I Have Is Yours 1948–1949 
 1957: Strictly From Dixie, Morty Corb and His Dixie All Stars 
 1996: Cocktail Mix, Vol. 1: Bachelor's Guide to the Galaxy 

As composer/arranger
 2009: Walt Disney and the 1964 World's Fair (arranger) 
 2005: Deep Velvet/Old Gold and Ivory, George Shearing (orchestration) 
 2001: As Time Goes By, Carpenters (arranger) 
 1998: Let's Get Together, Hayley Mills (composer) 
 1996: Incredibly Strange - Only In America (composer)
 1996: Ultra-Lounge, Vol. 11: Organs in Orbit (composer)

As conductor
 2009: This Could Be the Start of Something Good, Jack Jones (conductor)
 1997: Ultra-Lounge, Vol. 15: Wild Cool & Swingin' Too
 1995: Hooray for Love: Great Gentlemen of Song, Vol. 1
 1967: Dale Evans, Roy Rogers, and the Bill Lee Singers, August 10 & 11, 1967, Capitol Records

Selected filmography 
Orchestra leader
 What's This Song? (1964)

Composer
 Summer Magic (1963) (orchestration)
 Mickey (17 episodes, 1964–1965)
 Seaside Westside (September 16, 1964)
 The Big Jump (September 23, 1964)
 The Case of the Slippery Slipsy (September 30, 1964)
 How to Raise Children Without Really Trying (October 7, 1964)by)
 Mickey Crashes the Movies (October 14, 1964)
 The Way the Fortune Cookie Crumbles (October 21, 1964)
 Goodnight, Whoever You Are (October 28, 1964)
 Nobody Buys Retail (November 4, 1964)
 Hard Work Never Hurt Anyone (November 11, 1964)
 Honest Injun (November 25, 1964)
 Somebody's Been Sleeping in My Bed (December 2, 1964)
 For the Love of Grandpa Toddie (December 9, 1964)
 One More Kiss (December 16, 1964) (composer & conductor)
 Luck O' the Irish (December 23, 1964)
 The Elephant Mickey Won't Forget (December 30, 1964)
 Be My Guest (January 6, 1965)
 Mickey Takes Over (January 13, 1965)

 Vacation Playhouse (1 episode, 1963)
 Hooray for Love (1963 TV episode)

Music department
 Banjo the Woodpile Cat (1979) (TV) (additional orchestrator)
 Walt Disney's Wonderful World of Color (orchestrator) (2 episodes, 1965)
 Summer Magic: Part 2 (1965) TV episode (orchestrator)
 Summer Magic: Part 1 (1965) TV episode (orchestrator)

Actor
 Starlift (1951 film) (uncredited — piano player soldier)

Sideman
 Meet the Dixieland Bands, Volume 2 — Firehouse Five Plus Two, Red Nichols and His Pennies, Pete Daily and His Chicagoians, Swingtime Video (1985)

Selected musical dramas 
 It's a Small World, music by the Sherman Brothers, arranged by Hammack
 Premiered at the New York World's Fair 1964–1965
 Sam, the Story of the Good Samaritan, by Bobby Hammack & Tom Adair (1973)

Selected radio shows 
 1950s: Musical Express with the Bobby Hammack Quintet, AM Radio
 Stars of Jazz, Art Pepper Quartet: Art Pepper, alto sax; Carl Perkins, piano; Ben Tucker (né Benjamin Mayer Tucker; born 1930), acoustic double bass, and Frankie Capp, drums — Bobby Hammack, piano, accompanied vocalist Jo Ann Greer
 Aired on channel 7 KABC-TV (channel 7), January 28, 1957
 Licensed to and distributed by the Armed Forces Radio and Television Service
 Edited and presented on AF-9313 as Show #20
 Cross Country USA, AFRTS 226, January 30, 1978

Family 

 One of Hammack's three daughters, Karen Hammack (née Jean Karen Hammack; born 1955), is a studio pianist and music educator based in the Los Angeles area.

References 

American jazz pianists
American male pianists
American film score composers
American jazz composers
American male jazz composers
American Broadcasting Company executives
Musicians from Texas
University of Texas at Austin College of Fine Arts alumni
Musicians from Los Angeles
1922 births
1990 deaths
20th-century classical musicians
20th-century American composers
20th-century American pianists
American male film score composers
20th-century jazz composers
20th-century American male musicians